Janmabhoomi is a 1969 Malayalam film written, directed and produced by John Sankaramangalam. The film stars Madhu, Kottarakkara Sreedharan Nair, S. P. Pillai and Ushakumari in the lead roles. It marked the directorial debut of Sankaramangalam, who later directed critically acclaimed feature films like Avalalppam Vaikippoyi (1971) and Samantharam (1985), and cinematographer Ashok Kumar. It won the Nargis Dutt Award for Best Feature Film on National Integration and a Kerala State Film Award for Best Cinematography.

Cast
 Kottarakkara Sreedharan Nair as Mathai
 Madhu as John
 S. P. Pillai as Pillai
 Manavalan Joseph as Usman
 Janardhanan as Nambiar
 Ramchand as Kunhan
 Ushakumari as Madhavi
 Shobha as Chembi
T. R. Omana as Mariya
 Snehalatha as Thresya
 K. V. Sharada as Grameena
 Baby Saroja as Baby
 Baby Shanthi as Balan

Soundtrack
The music was composed by B. A. Chidambaranath and the lyrics were written by P. Bhaskaran.

Production
The film was made with financial support from the Film Finance Corporation. The film was shot in Wayanad on the Western Ghats.

The Film was distributed by Dinny Films.

Awards
The film won the Nargis Dutt Award for Best Feature Film on National Integration for its theme of religious co-existence. It also won the Kerala State Film Award for Best Cinematography for Ashok Kumar.

References

External links
 
 Janmabhoomi at the Malayalam Movie Database

1960s Malayalam-language films
1969 directorial debut films
1969 films
Films directed by John Sankaramangalam
Best Film on National Integration National Film Award winners